Stenz is a surname of German origin, derived from the name Stanislav. Notable people with the surname include:

 Georg Maria Stenz (1869–1928), German missionary
 Markus Stenz (born 1965), German conductor

Surnames of German origin